Champps Americana (commonly known as Champps) is a casual dining restaurant chain and sports bar. There are 3 locations across the United States.

History

Champps began in 1984 as a small restaurant in Saint Paul, Minnesota and was called Concourse 7. The name of the restaurant was soon changed to "Champps" and they transformed into a sports bar, selling beer, burgers and sandwiches. The business added big screen televisions to their restaurants, for patrons to watch the latest sports games, while eating their meal.

Champps is owned by Champps Entertainment, Inc., an affiliate of Fox & Hound Restaurant Group. Fox & Hound's parent company bought Champps Entertainment in 2007.

On December 15, 2013, the restaurant chain filed for bankruptcy, and again on August 10, 2016. , there are 3 locations still in operation: one each in Wisconsin, Minnesota, and Indiana.

References

External links

Companies based in Wichita, Kansas
Restaurants established in 1984
Regional restaurant chains in the United States
American companies established in 1984
1984 establishments in Minnesota
Companies that filed for Chapter 11 bankruptcy in 2013
Companies that filed for Chapter 11 bankruptcy in 2016